The Mystery of San Nicandro is a feature-length documentary inspired by the book, The Jews of San Nicandro, written by John Davis, about a group of Italian Roman Catholics in a small village, who underwent a mass conversion to Judaism in Fascist Italy. And who over a period of twenty years of observing Jewish practices, left Italy and emigrated to the new state of Israel in 1949.

Synopsis

Production
The Mystery of San Nicandro was shot in Toronto, Hamilton, San Nicandro, Calabria, Sicily, and Israel in 2012. The film was developed in association with documentary and was produced with the participation of The Bell Broadcast and New Media Fund, The Canada Media Fund, The Ontario Film and Media Development Corporation, The Rogers Cable Network Fun, and The Canadian Film or Video Production Tax Credits.

Reception
Independent television reviewer James Bawden, in regards to  The Mystery of San Nicandro, proclaimed that, "there is hope for Canadian TV."

References

External links
 Official site

2012 in Canadian television
Canadian documentary films
Italian documentary films
Documentary films about Jews and Judaism
Jews and Judaism in Italy